Gideon's Crossing is an American medical drama starring Andre Braugher.  The series is loosely based on the experience of real-life physician Jerome Groopman and his book The Measure of Our Days. It premiered on October 10, 2000, and ran for one season, with its last episode airing on April 9, 2001, with one episode ("The Old School") remaining unaired.

Cast
 Andre Braugher as Dr. Ben Gideon
 Rubén Blades as Dr. Max Cabranes
 Eric Dane as Dr. Wyatt Cooper
 Russell Hornsby as Dr. Aaron Boies
 Ravi Kapoor as Dr. Siddartha Shandor
 Sophie Keller as Dr. Maya Stiles
 Hamish Linklater as Dr. Bruce Cherry
 Rhona Mitra as Dr. Alejandra Klein
 Kevin J. O'Connor as Dr. Michael Pirandello
 Meagan Gregory as Rose Gideon
 Jascha Washington as Eli Gideon
 Brian Wiltshire as Charlie Gideon

Episodes

See also
 List of The Practice episodes - includes crossover episode "Gideon's Crossover"

References

External links
 

2000s American drama television series
2000s American medical television series
2000 American television series debuts
2001 American television series endings
American Broadcasting Company original programming
Television shows based on books
English-language television shows
Television series by ABC Studios
Television series created by Paul Attanasio
Television shows set in Boston